Saeed Anwar PP (born 6 September 1968) is a Pakistani former cricketer and a former captain for Tests and ODIs. An opening batsman and occasional slow left arm orthodox bowler, Anwar played international cricket between 1989 and 2003. Considered one of greatest opening batsmen Pakistan has ever produced, Anwar has scored twenty centuries in ODIs, more than any other Pakistani batsmen in this format. He played 55 Test matches, scoring 4052 runs with eleven centuries, average 45.52. In 247 One Day Internationals (ODIs) he made 8824 runs at an average of 39.21. Anwar is credited for being one of the most stylish batsmen of 1990s alongside Mark Waugh, Damien Martyn and Sourav Ganguly. His timing, elegance and placement of cricket shots are widely admired by cricket fans.

Anwar got a pair at his Test debut against the West Indies in 1990, and scored 169 runs in his third Test against New Zealand in February 1994. In 1998–99, he became the third Pakistani to carry his bat through a Test innings, and scored his highest Test score of 188 not out. He made four ODI centuries at Sharjah Cricket Association Stadium, including three consecutive during 1993–94. Anwar scored two successive hundreds on three occasions in his career. He is most notable for scoring 194 runs against India in Chennai in 1997, the highest score for that time, and now the tenth highest individual score in an ODI. Anwar participated in three Cricket World Cups, and captained Pakistan in seven Tests and 11 ODIs. In August 2003, he announced his retirement from International cricket.
Saeed Anwar was the highest runs scoring batsman for Pakistan in 2003 World Cup.

Personal life 

Saeed Anwar was born on 6 September 1968 in Karachi. In 1973, he shifted with his family to Canada and came back to Karachi in 1977. Anwar went to high school at Government Degree Science College, Malir Cantt and went to university at NED University of Engineering and Technology, Karachi. He graduated from NED in 1989 majoring in Computer System Engineering. He was planning to go to the United States for his Master's studies before becoming a professional Test cricketer. His father, a businessman by profession, played cricket at club level whereas his brother, Jawed Anwar, represented Lahore Under-19 cricket team.

Anwar married his cousin, Lubna, a doctor by profession, in March 1996. He faced a personal tragedy in 2001 when his daughter, Bismah, died after a prolonged illness. As a result, he turned religious and starting preaching Islam across Pakistan with the Tablighi Jamaat. He made his return to cricket after a long hiatus and was one of the most consistent Pakistani batsmen in the 2003 World Cup. However upon his return, he lost his previous touch and could not perform as he did before. He was criticized for the loss of form which led to his retirement from cricket soon. "I retired because I felt unwanted", he said. At the time he left cricket he was a computer engineer by profession. During his career, he was an elegant batsman and played particularly well on the off side, his trademark flick being a sure shot feature in almost all of his innings. He led the funeral prayers for his former teammate Wasim Akram's spouse, Huma Akram, in Lahore.

International career

Test career 

Anwar was an outstanding opener in Test cricket. He played 55 Test matches for Pakistan and scored 4052 at the average of 45.52. He is the seventh-highest run scorer for Pakistan in Test cricket, and scored 11 centuries and 25 half-centuries during his international career. As an aggressive opening batsman, most of his centuries turned into relatively big scores. He scored many of his centuries away against almost every team he toured, and averaged more than 40 against three of the four nations – South Africa, Australia, New Zealand and England – which have been most difficult for Asian batsmen. He has the highest Test batting average (59.06) of any Pakistani against Australia, and once scored two consecutive centuries against them. Former Pakistan captain Ramiz Raja commented the "[Anwar] used an eclectic approach to batting – classical betrothed to unorthodox, footwork against spin as quick as a hiccup supple yet powerful to brush the field like a Picasso."

He made his Test debut against the West Indies in a match which Pakistan lost at Iqbal Stadium, Faisalabad, in 1990. He got a pair in the match. Curtly Ambrose and Ian Bishop dismissed him in the first and second innings respectively. In the third Test of his career, Anwar scored 169 runs in Pakistan's solitary innings against New Zealand in February 1994; Pakistan won the match by an innings and 12 runs. Later in the same year during Pakistan's tour to Sri Lanka, his 94 and 136 runs in the first match at Colombo earned him a man of the match award, and ensured Pakistan's victory by 301 runs. Scroring fifties—85 and 77 runs—in both the innings of the first Test against Australia at Karachi in September 1994, Anwar helped Pakistan led the three match series 1–0. In the same season against Zimbabwe, he was unsuccessful with bat in the away series; he only managed 45 runs playing in four innings of two Tests. Anwar scored three consecutive fifties against Sri Lanka in the 1995 home series. In the series, he played three innings scoring 154 runs with an average of 51.50.

In the 1996 Pakistan's tour of England, a three-Test match series was played between the teams. Pakistan won the series by 2–0, their fifth consecutive series win against England. Anwar remained the second highest run scorer with 362 runs – only behind Alec Stewart's 396 – with an average of 60.33. He scored 88 and 74 runs in the first Test at Lord's, and 176 and one runs in the third match at The Oval. In the 1996–97 season, he played two Tests against the touring Zimbabwe and aggregated 182 runs in three innings, the second highest after Wasim Akram's 292. In the same season, Anwar replaced injured Akram as captain for the home series against New Zealand. He was the second highest run-scorer once again, accumulating 157 runs in three innings, including 149 in the second Test at Rawalpindi Cricket Stadium. In the next home series, against South Africa in 1997–98, he only scored 40 runs in four innings at the average of 8.00. He aggregated 236 runs in the away series against the same team—only behind Azhar Mahmood's 327. He scored 118 runs in the second Test at Kingsmead Cricket Ground, which allowed Pakistan to win a Test match for the first time in South Africa. Anwar scored 150 runs at the average of 37.50, during Pakistan's tour to Zimbabwe.

In the 1998–99 season, Anwar played two Tests against the touring Australia, and scored 290 at the average of 96.66, including two centuries. His partnership of 120 runs with Mushtaq Ahmed, for the ninth, prevented Pakistan's collapse in the first innings of the first Test at the Rawalpindi Cricket Stadium. He scored 145 runs in the match, but Pakistan lost the match by an innings and 99 runs. In the next home series, Anwar played two matches against Zimbabwe, scoring 142 runs at the average of 47.33. He was ineffective against India, scoring 101 runs in two matches, during Pakistan's tour to India.

In the first Test of the 1998–99 Asian Test Championship, Anwar became the third Pakistani to carry his bat through a Test innings, following father and son Nazar Mohammed and Mudassar Nazar. Anwar's career best 188 not out in the second innings at the Eden Gardens—beating the team's total at the previous innings (185) where he made a duck—was 60 per cent of the total, 316. It was also the highest Test score by a Pakistani on Indian soil which was surpassed by Younus Khan; Younus scored 267 runs at the M Chinnaswamy Stadium in the third Test of the 2004–05 series between the teams. He was the fourth highest run-scorer of the tournament, with 290 runs from five innings, averaged 72.50.

Anwar played three Test during Pakistan's tour of Australia in 1999–2000 season, scoring 282 runs at the average of 47.00. His performance in the series, a century and two fifties, could not prevent Pakistan's defeat of 3–0. Anwar captained Pakistan in the first two Tests during the Sri Lanka tour to Pakistan, and scored 217 runs at the average of 54.25. In the reply series in 2000, Pakistan and Sri Lanka played three matches and won the series 2–0. Anwar scored 185 runs, including a century and a fifty. During the 2000–01, he played five matches against England, three at home and two at away; in both the series, he scored at averages less than 31 and 16 respectively. Anwar's last Test was against Bangladesh during the 2001–02 Asian Test Championship; he scored 101 runs in Pakistan's solitary innings which ensured an innings and 264 runs win at the Multan Cricket Stadium. His daughter died the same day.

One Day International career 

Anwar played 247 ODI matches for Pakistan and scored 8824 runs from 244 innings at the average of 39.21. He is third in the list of leading run-scorers for Pakistan in the format after Inzamam-ul-Haq and Mohammad Yousuf. With 20 centuries, he is Pakistan's leading century-maker in ODIs. Anwar was the first Pakistani batsman to score a century against India on Indian soil in an ODI match.

Under the captaincy of Imran Khan, Anwar started his international career in January 1989 with an ODI match played at WACA Ground which Pakistan lost to West Indies. He scored only 3 runs in the match. His first match-winning performance came against India in December 1989 at Jinnah Stadium, Gujranwala. He scored unbeaten 42 runs off 32 balls in the match. In the 1989–90 World Series Cup, Anwar played nine matches and scored 293 runs with the help of a century, and at the average of 32.55. His best performance in the series was 126 runs against Sri Lanka at Adelaide Oval. His next performance was against New Zealand in 1990–91, when he was the top-scorer of the series, with 203 runs. Pakistan won the three-match series 3–0. In 1993, he made four ODI centuries at Sharjah Cricket Association Stadium, including three consecutive centuries against Sri Lanka, West Indies and Sri Lanka respectively, during 1993–94 Wills Trophy and became the second of the four players to do so. He scored two successive hundreds on three other occasions in his career, and was the first batsman to complete this feat in ODIs—in 1996, in 1999, and in 2000. In six matches of the 1994–95 Wills Trophy, he scored 202 runs at the average of 40.40, including a century. He scored a century against Sri Lanka at Gymkhana Club Ground in October 1996, while captaining the team.

On 21 May 1997 in Chennai, Anwar scored 194 against India in India in an ODI match in the 1997 Pepsi Independence Cup. Charles Coventry equalled the feat on 16 August 2009, against Bangladesh. This was the highest individual score by any batsman in the world till Sachin Tendulkar scored an unbeaten 200 against South Africa on 24 February 2010. He accumulated 315 runs from the five matches of the 1998 Silver Jubilee Independence Cup, including 140 runs in the third final against India at Dhaka; India won the match by three wickets.

World Cup Performance
Anwar played in three Cricket World Cups for Pakistan: 1996, 1999 and 2003. He played 21 matches and scored 915 runs at the average of 53.82, and his highest score in a world cup match remained 113 not out. In 1996 Cricket World Cup, Anwar made three fifties, Against India in the second Quarter-final at Bangalore, he made 48. Pakistan lost the match by 39 runs. He made 329 in the tournament. In 1999 Cricket World Cup, he made two consecutive centuries, 103 against Zimbabwe and 113 not out against New Zealand in the Semi-final, and led Pakistan into the Final. He scored 368 runs in the tournament. He played his last match against Zimbabwe during the 2003 World Cup in which he made unbeaten 40 runs. The match ended without result due to rain. In the previous match played against India which Pakistan lost by six wickets, he scored his fourth century against them and 20th overall. Anwar dedicated the century to his daughter, who died in 2001.

Captaincy
Anwar captained Pakistan in seven Tests and 11 ODIs, but his performance as captain was average.

Retirement
He announced his retirement from International cricket on 15 August 2003, after he was dropped from the squad for the upcoming One-Day International tournament in Sharjah.

Records and achievements

Awards
 Wisden Cricketer of the Year (1997)
 Pride of Performance (2000)

Trivial statistics
Opened in 32 ODI innings with Aamir Sohail for Pakistan, in 1994–95, the most consecutive by a Pakistan opening pair and fourth overall.
The third Pakistan batsman after Nazar Mohammed and Mudassar Nazar to carry his bat in a test innings. He scored unbeaten 188 runs in the match and Pakistan won the match by 46 runs. it was also the highest Test score by a Pakistani on Indian soil which was surpassed by Younis Khan in 2005.
Anwar (194) and Charles Coventry (194*) shared the record for highest individual score in an ODI match until it was overtaken by the Sachin Tendulkar (200*) against South Africa on 24 February 2010 It remained a record for Pakistan until Fakhar Zaman made 210* against Zimbabwe on 20 July 2018.
Anwar scored two or more successive hundreds on four occasions, and made 20 hundreds in One Day Internationals as a Pakistani opening batsman.
He holds the highest Test batting average (59.06) of any Pakistani against Australia in Test matches.

Performance

Test Performance by Opponent

ODI Performance by Opponent

See also
Pairs on Test debut
List of highest individual scores in ODIs
List of Pakistan One Day International cricket records
List of Cricket World Cup centuries

Notes

References

External links
 
 
 
 

1968 births
Living people
Cricketers from Karachi
Zarai Taraqiati Bank Limited cricketers
Pakistan Test cricket captains
Cricketers at the 1996 Cricket World Cup
Cricketers at the 1999 Cricket World Cup
Cricketers at the 2003 Cricket World Cup
Karachi cricketers
Pakistan One Day International cricketers
Pakistan Test cricketers
United Bank Limited cricketers
Wisden Cricketers of the Year
NED University of Engineering & Technology alumni
Recipients of the Pride of Performance
Pakistani cricketers
Lahore Blues cricketers
Karachi Whites cricketers
Karachi Blues cricketers
National Bank of Pakistan cricketers
Pakistani Sunni Muslims
Muslim missionaries
Tablighi Jamaat people